Anatakupu Island is an island in the Marlborough District of New Zealand. A navigational beacon is proposed for the island for sailors travelling along French Pass.

See also

 List of islands of New Zealand
 List of islands
 Desert island

References

External links
TAIC advisory for light on Anatakupu

Uninhabited islands of New Zealand
Islands of the Marlborough Sounds